The Nahr al-Kalb (meaning Dog River) is a river in Lebanon.

Inscriptions

Nahr al-Kalb is the ancient Lycus River. Past generals and conquerors have traditionally built monuments at the mouth of the Nahr al-Kalb, known as the Commemorative stelae of Nahr el-Kalb.

The entire site of the Nahr el-Kelb valley with the archaeological sites it conceals is classified on the indicative list of UNESCO world heritage.

Geography 
The river originates at a low altitude from a source that originates from the Jeita Grotto. The river receives the seasonal contribution of torrents from Mount Lebanon, and is almost dry in summer.

Notes

Kalb
Tourism in Lebanon
Tourist attractions in Lebanon